Philipp Wolfgang (31 July 1595, Bouxwiller – , Bouxwiller) was a count of Hanau-Lichtenberg. He ruled the county from 1625 until his death.

Youth 
Philipp Wolfgang was a son of Count Johann Reinhard I of Hanau-Lichtenberg (1569–1625) and his wife Countess Maria Elisabeth of Hohenlohe-Neuenstein-Weikersheim (1576–1605). He attended the University of Strasbourg. His Grand Tour took him via Germany to France, Italy and England.

Government 
The focus of the government of Count Philipp Wolfgang were the problems caused by the Thirty Years' War. It is reported that he mostly led the government personally and consequently had to travel a lot. This is inconsistent with the later references, which report that he was frequently ill.

His father had initiated a relatively successful policy of neutrality. He tried to continue this policy, but failed. In 1631, the war hit the district of Babenhausen, where imperial troops occupied and looted the city and Babenhausen Castle. One year later, a Swedish army led by Wolf Heinrich von Isenburg invaded the district. Between 23 February and 28 March 1635, the city was (unsuccessfully) besieged by the imperial army, led by Philipp von Mansfeld. In 1636, the Archbishopric of Mainz occupied Babenhausen.

The Hanau-Lichtenberg possessions in the Alsace and at the Upper Rhine were also hit. The imperial troops looted and pillaged numerous villages there, too. Philipp Wolfgang's army captured imperial redoubts at Drusenau and Lichtenau. But overall, his limited means meant that he stood little chance of asserting himself successfully in this conflict. In 1633, the Swedish troops reached the Upper Rhine part of the county. They fought battles and looted in Hanau-Lichtenberg and neighbouring territories. In Pfaffenhofen, for example, only two families survived the war. Bouxwiller, “capital” of the county, was ransacked by Croat troops in 1638. The Swedes formed an alliance with the French, who then occupied Pfaffenhofen, Bouxwiller and Ingweiler. The French occupation force was attacked by imperial troops under Field Marshal Matthias Gallas. The city of Woerth was sacked twice. The next wave of incoming soldiers was the Protestant army under Duke Bernhard of Saxe-Weimar, who established his headquarters in Brumath. Bernhard of Saxe-Weimat was a competent military leader, but did not possess his own territory. It was rumoured that he intended to create a separate territory from areas he had conquered in the Alsace. This brought him into conflict with France, which wanted to annex the Alsace to itself. So Philipp Wolfgang placed himself under the protection of the French king and spent much of his time at his residence in Strasbourg for security reasons. All cities and villages in his territory were affected by the war. Like his predecessor, Philipp Wolfgang did not participate in witch hunts, which were spreading rapidly, so these were rare in Hanau-Lichtenberg.

Death 
In his will, Philipp Wolfgang named his eldest son Friedrich Casimir as his sole heir. His younger sons received residences, but no sovereignty. Johann Philipp received the district of Babenhausen; Johann Reinhard received Lichtenberg.

He was buried in Lichtenberg.

Marriage and issue 

Wolfgang Philipp married twice:
 15 November 1619 Countess Johanna of Oettingen (born: 30 August 1602; died: 17 September 1639 in Strasbourg, initially buried in St. Peter in Strasbourg, then transferred to Bouxwiller ( and buried with Philipp Wolfgang). In this marriage were born:
 Johann Ludwig (born: 14 June 1621 in Strasbourg; died: 30 January 1623 in Bouxwiller), buried in the City Church in Bouxwiller
 Anna Elisabeth (born: 19 May 1622 in Bouxwiller; died: 21 May 1622 in Bouxwiller), buried in the City Church in Bouxwiller
 Friedrich Casimir (born: 4 August 1623; died: 30 March 1685)
 Dorothea Elisabeth (* November 19, 1624 in Bouxwiller, died: 21 November 1624), buried in the City Church in Bouxwiller
 Johann Philipp (born:  in Bouxwiller; died: 18 December 1669 in Babenhausen)
 Johanna Juliane (born: 4 January 1627 at Bouxwiller; died: 4 September 1628, in Bouxwiller)
 Johann Reinhard II (born:  in Bouxwiller; died: 25 April 1666 in Bischofsheim am hohen Steg)
 Sophie Eleonore (13 April 1630 in Bouxwiller; died: in La Petite-Pierre, buried in Bouxwiller), unmarried, lived with her sister Agatha Christine. A funeral sermon was published at her funeral.
 Agatha Christine (born: 23 September 1632; died: 5 December 1681), married to Leopold Louis, Count Palatine of Veldenz-Lützelstein
 Christian Eberhard (born:  in Strasbourg, died: 4 May 1636, in Strasbourg, buried in Bouxwiller). At his funeral, a funeral sermon was published.
 After 17 May 1640 Wild- and Rhinegravine Dorothea Diana of Salm (born: 25 July 1604 in Criechingen, died: 19 December 1672 in Wörth), widow of Count Ludwig Philipp of Rappoltstein (died: 19 December 1672). She was buried in Bouxwiller. A funeral sermon was published by Günther Heiler, Superintendent and Consistory Councillor of the county of Hanau-Lichtenberg.

Ancestors

References 
 Reinhard Dietrich: Die Landesverfassung in dem Hanauischen, Hanauer Geschichtsblätter, vol. 34, Hanau 1996, 
 M. Goltzené: Aus der Geschichte des Amtes Buchsweiler, in: Pay d’Alsace, issue 111/112, p. 64 ff
 Wilhelm Morhardt: Hanau alt's – in Ehren b'halt's – Die Grafen von Hanau-Lichtenberg in Geschichte und Geschichten, Babenhausen einst und jetz, vol. 10, Babenhausen, 1984
 Fritz Roth: Restlose Auswertung von Leichenpredigten und Personalschriften für genealogische und kulturhistorische Zwecke, vol 6, Boppart, 1970
 Reinhard Suchier: Genealogie des Hanauer Grafenhauses, in: Festschrift des Hanauer Geschichtsvereins zu seiner fünfzigjährigen Jubelfeier am 27. August 1894, Hanau, 1894
 Georg Wittenberger: Stadtlexikon Babenhausen, Babenhausen, 1995
 Ernst J. Zimmermann: Hanau Stadt und Land, third edition, Hanau, 1919, reprinted 1978.

Footnotes 

Counts of Hanau-Lichtenberg
1595 births
1641 deaths
17th-century German people